Shamarin is a Turkmen village in northern Aleppo Governorate, northwestern Syria.

The village administratively belongs to Nahiya Azaz in Azaz District. Nearby localities include Shamarikh  to the south and Tulayl ash-Sham  to the southwest. In the 2004 census, Shamarin had a population of 506.

References

Populated places in Aleppo Governorate
Turkmen communities in Syria